The 2010 Al Habtoor Tennis Challenge was a women's tennis tournament on the 2010 ITF Women's Circuit under the tier of the 2010 WTA Tour. It took place in Dubai from 13–19 December. The prize money was US$75,000.

WTA entrants

Seeds

Other entrants

Wildcards
The following players received wildcards into the singles main draw:

  Silvia Njirić
  Tamaryn Hendler
  Valeria Savinykh
  Julia Babilon

Qualifiers
The following players received entry from the qualifying draw:

  Anna Fitzpatrick
  Korina Perkovic
  Maryna Zanevska
  Alexandra Cadanţu

Singles champion

 Sania Mirza def.  Bojana Jovanovski, 4-6, 6-3, 6-0

Doubles champions

 Julia Görges /  Petra Martić def.  Sania Mirza /  Vladimíra Uhlířová, 6-4, 7-6(7)

References
 

Al Habtoor Tennis Challenge
Al Habtoor Tennis Challenge
Al Habtoor Tennis Challenge